The 2019–20 Fresno State Bulldogs men's basketball team represented California State University, Fresno in the 2019–20 NCAA Division I men's basketball season. The Bulldogs were led by second-year head coach Justin Hutson and played their home games at the Save Mart Center as members of the Mountain West Conference. They finished the season 11–19, 7–11 in Mountain West play to finish in a tie for seventh place. They lost in the first round of the Mountain West tournament to Air Force.

Previous season
The Bulldogs finished the season 23–9, 13–5 in Mountain West play to finish in third place. They defeated Air Force in the quarterfinals of the Mountain West tournament before losing in the semifinals to Utah State. Despite having 23 wins, they did not participate in a postseason tournament.

Offseason

Departures

Incoming transfers

2019 recruiting class

2020 recruiting class

Roster

Schedule and results
Source

|-
!colspan=12 style=| Exhibition

|-
!colspan=12 style=| Regular season

|-
!colspan=12 style=| Mountain West tournament

References

Fresno State Bulldogs men's basketball seasons
Fresno State